Manoj Kumar RC (born on 11 May 1983), credited as Manoj RC is a Nepali film actor  known for his versatile acting. He has received Kamana Film Award for Best Actor in Negative Role for his performance in Madhumas.  It was a blockbuster and his role was well appreciated by the audiences. He rose to prominence from his debut historical film Bir Ganeshman portraying in the role of martyr Gangalal Shrestha in 2002. His first leading role in a film was Lakshya. He has appeared in significant music videos including Paap Punya song by Hemant Rana.

In addition to acting, he is a humanitarian and has taken part in street dramas related to sanitation and health in the earthquake affected areas after the April 2015 Nepal earthquake.

Early life

Manoj was born on 11 May 1983 in Paink, Jajarkot district , a remote area in Mid-Western Nepal. He has a younger brother. His father was a Government of Nepal employee working under Ministry of Education (Nepal). Although he was born in Jajarkot, he could not stay for a long time in his birth place. He has visited most parts of Nepal according to the job transfer of his father. He completed secondary level education from Janata Higher Secondary Sechool, Khalanga, Rukum district in 1998. He was good in study and other extra curriculum activities like martial art and drama. He went to Kathmandu for higher studies and also joined acting classes, martial art training. Then, he met and collaborated with writer Nabindra Raj Joshi and director Manoj Pandit and entered in Nepali film Industry.

Acting career

Manoj debut film was Bir Ganeshman as a supporting role in 2002. The historical film was directed by Sahajman Shrestha and Bijay Ratna Tuladhar and written by Nabindra Raj Joshi which was under the banner of Ganesh Man Singh Study Foundation. His role as Martyr Gangalal Shrestha was much appreciated. His first Feature film in the leading actor was thriller young love story Lakshya (2004) which was produced by Harendra Limbu under the banner of Ingnam pictures and directed by Manoj Pandit. Later he also played as the Leading role in movie C-Mala (The Necklace) in 2013 which was shot in the beautiful location in Mustang. It was directed by Rudra Bahadur Gurung. The film was nominated in the Fukuoka Asian Film Festival (Japan) in 2015  and was officially selected by Hongkong International Film and TV Market(FILMART). His another blockbuster was romantic Thriller film Madhumas(2013). He received Kamana Film Award for Best Actor in Negative Role from the movie. He was also nominated in another three awards for the same category. He has acted in the comedy movie Humjayaga(2014). In 2016, he appeared as the leading actor in the movie Jhumkee. His awaited movie Mithya is expected to be released soon.

Personal life
Manoj RC is married to Anita (2004) Shah who is working in a commercial bank . They have a daughter named Sambriddhi RC.

Filmography

Films

Music videos

Awards and nominations

References

1983 births
Living people
Nepalese male actors
People from Jajarkot District